Chikaskia Township is a township in Kingman County, Kansas, USA.  As of the 2000 census, its population was 140.

Geography
Chikaskia Township covers an area of 36.24 square miles (93.85 square kilometers); of this, 0.01 square miles (0.01 square kilometers) or 0.01 percent is water. The streams of Sand Creek and Wild Horse Creek run through this township.

Cities and towns
 Spivey

Adjacent townships
 Belmont Township (north)
 Richland Township (northeast)
 Valley Township (east)
 Township No. 1, Harper County (south)
 Rochester Township (west)
 Peters Township (northwest)

Major highways
 K-42 (Kansas highway)

Airports and landing strips
 Dick Landing Strip

References
 U.S. Board on Geographic Names (GNIS)
 United States Census Bureau cartographic boundary files

External links
 US-Counties.com
 City-Data.com

Townships in Kingman County, Kansas
Townships in Kansas